Martin Foster may refer to:

 Martin Foster (footballer) (born 1977), English footballer
 Martin D. Foster (1861–1919), U.S. Representative from Illinois
 Martin Foster (golfer) (born 1952), English golfer